Fladholmen Lighthouse or Flatholmen Lighthouse is a coastal lighthouse in Sola municipality in Rogaland county, Norway.  The lighthouse is located on a small, flat islet located just west of the village of Tananger. The lighthouse was established in 1862, rebuilt in 1952, and replaced with an electric lamp in 1984.

The occulting light is on for 3 seconds, then off for 3 seconds. The light is white, red or green depending on the direction. The station includes at least two -story keeper's houses and several other buildings.

See also

 List of lighthouses in Norway
 Lighthouses in Norway

References

External links
 Norsk Fyrhistorisk Forening 
 Picture of Flatholmen Lighthouse

Lighthouses completed in 1862
Lighthouses in Rogaland
1862 establishments in Norway